Events from the year 1742 in Canada.

Incumbents
French Monarch: Louis XV
British and Irish Monarch: George II

Governors
Governor General of New France: Charles de la Boische, Marquis de Beauharnois
Colonial Governor of Louisiana: Jean-Baptiste Le Moyne de Bienville
Governor of Nova Scotia: Paul Mascarene
Commodore-Governor of Newfoundland: Henry Medley

Events
 First scientific report on the North Pacific fur seal.
 First Fort Paskoya built by La Vérendrye at Cedar Lake.

Births
 Esteban José Martínez Fernández y Martínez de la Sierra, naval officer (died 1798)
 Benjamin Frobisher, fur-trader (died 1787)

Historical documents
Without Île-Royale "and other Indulgencies at the Treaty of Utrecht," France's fisheries would have "by this time been totally destroyed"

"What humanity!" - French missionary surprised by Indigenous travel companions' generosity with game they hunt (Note: "savages" used)

"Indefatigable, artful, insinuating" priests among Six Nations assert France's "Power and Grandeur" and "render the English[...]contemptible"

Poor crop at Lorette means people must forage for food, "which is prejudicial[...]to their spiritual interests" (Note: "savages" used)

Montreal renews law requiring ladders on roofs and by chimneys and attic battering rams, all in case of fire

When Northwest Passage not found, Arthur Dobbs suggests locating trading posts up rivers that flow to Hudson Bay and James Bay

Joseph La France canoes down Nelson River in warm, leafy spring and arrives at York Factory on June 29 to find ice and snow

Nova Scotia Council president reminds Board of Trade that without their directives, he can maintain authority only through deputies

Mascarene tells Bishop of Quebec that priests "who presume to exercise any ecclesiastical power" in Nova Scotia violate British law

Rumours of war with France have not lessened Acadians' fidelity and obedience, except when growing families take "unappropriated lands"

Unmistakable warning to Acadians: "By continuing in your disobedience, you will oblige us to make use of force to reduce you to your duty"

Council hears first that ship's cables cut and ship robbed, then that cables and robbers found by Acadian deputies and "Indian Captains"

"Offensive and unwholsome" - Heating Hudson's Bay Co. buildings includes capping chimneys when fires burn down to coals, causing headache

References 

 
Canada
42